Potentilla delphinensis is a herbaceous perennial species of cinquefoil belonging to the family Rosaceae. It is endemic to France, where it is limited to the southern French Alps (Savoie et Dauphiné: Bauges; Isère; Hautes-Alpes, Col du Lautaret).

Description
The biological form of Potentilla delphiniensis is hemicryptophyte scapose, as its overwintering buds are situated just below the soil surface and the floral axis is more or less erect with a few leaves.

This plant has an erect, strong and hirsute stem reaching on average  in height. The leaves are in rosette, hairy, with a long petiole and are divided into five obovate and toothed leaflets with elongate lanceolate stipules. The flowering period extends from July through August. It is insect-pollinated.

It is sympatric with the similar congeners Potentilla grandiflora and Potentilla thuringiaca.

Gallery

References

External links
 Eunis
 Flores Alpes
 Inpn.mnhn
 Biolib
 Schede di botanica
 Rock Gardens

Further reading

delphinensis
Plants described in 1849
Endemic flora of France